This is a list of United Nations General Assembly resolutions at the sixty-seventh session of the United Nations General Assembly.

Resolutions

References

2013 in international relations
2012 in international relations
United Nations General Assembly resolutions